Salvia villosa is a herbaceous perennial that is native to the Mexican states of San Luis Potosi and Coahuila, growing at approximately  elevation in dry areas that have little or no frost.

The leaves and their margins are covered with short hairs, giving the plant its specific epithet, villosa, or "hairy". It never blooms profusely, but consistently puts out a few flowers from spring to autumn.

Notes

Plants described in 1900
villosa
Flora of Mexico